Nicholle Toh (born 18 August 2001) is a Singaporean swimmer. She competed in the women's 50 metre butterfly event at the 2018 FINA World Swimming Championships (25 m), in Hangzhou, China.

References

External links
 

2001 births
Living people
Singaporean female butterfly swimmers
Place of birth missing (living people)
Competitors at the 2017 Southeast Asian Games
Southeast Asian Games competitors for Singapore
21st-century Singaporean women